James Gordon (December 6, 1833November 28, 1912) was an American planter, writer, former Confederate officer and politician from Okolona, Mississippi.  He was a United States senator for eight weeks, from December 27, 1909 to February 22, 1910.

During the Civil War he was a Colonel in the Confederate Army and served in the Mississippi House of Representatives.  Following the death of Senator Anselm J. McLaurin, Gordon was appointed by Governor Edmond Noel on December 27, to fill the vacancy until the state legislature could elect a new U.S. Senator.

The day after his appointment by Governor Noel to the United States Senate, Gordon was identified by the Memphis Press-Scimitar as a former fugitive who had been sought as a suspect in the conspiracy to  assassinate President Abraham Lincoln.  Gordon was listed in 1865 by the United States government as a fugitive, and a reward of $10,000 had been offered for his capture, dead or alive. Later that year, he was ruled out of the suspects.  Gordon had admitted that he had met with John Wilkes Booth in Montreal in March 1865, and had discussed plans to kidnap Lincoln, but denied any discussion of an assassination.

Gordon served as an appointed U.S. Senator, until February 22, 1910, when he was succeeded by LeRoy Percy, who had been elected by the legislature.

References

External links

1833 births
1912 deaths
People of Mississippi in the American Civil War
Mississippi Democrats
Democratic Party United States senators from Mississippi
Writers from Mississippi
19th-century American politicians
People from Okolona, Mississippi